The Fort Thompson Formation is a geologic formation in Florida. It preserves fossils dating back to the late Pleistocene. It was influenced by sea level changes.

See also

 List of fossiliferous stratigraphic units in Florida

References

 

Geologic formations of Florida